The 1894 Hong Kong Sanitary Board election was an election held for the two unofficial seats in the Sanitary Board on 16 June 1894 but, there being only two candidates, the seats were filled uncontested.  John Joseph Francis was elected for a third term.

During the election, the 1894 Hong Kong plague devastated the colony and drew attention to the composition and power of the board. One proposal, supported by unofficial member of the Legislative Council Ho Kai, called for it to be upgraded to a municipal council with enhanced powers. Others sought its abolition.

Overview of outcome

References
 Endacott, G. B. Government and people in Hong Kong, 1841-1962 : a constitutional history Hong Kong University Press. (1964)

1894 elections in Asia
1894 in Hong Kong
Sanitary
Uncontested elections
June 1894 events